Johannes Aanderaa (6 November 1927 – 2 June 1991) was a Norwegian librarian, theatre critic, publisher and civil servant. He was a theatre critic for the magazine Syn og Segn. He worked for the Norwegian Broadcasting Corporation from 1954 to 1958. He chaired the publishing house Det Norske Samlaget from 1958 to 1972. He was a civil servant in the Ministry of Church and Education from 1972, later Ministry of Cultural and Scientific Affairs, and a central person in the shaping of Norwegian cultural and educational policy.

References

1927 births
1991 deaths
People from Narvik
Norwegian theatre critics
NRK people
Norwegian civil servants
20th-century Norwegian writers